Omnipresent  is the sixth studio album by technical death metal band Origin.

The album reached number 10 on the US Billboard Top New Artist Albums (Heatseekers).

Track listing

Personnel
 Origin
Jason Keyser - lead vocals  
Paul Ryan - guitars, backing vocals
Mike Flores - bass, backing vocals
John Longstreth - drums

 Additional musicians
Jason Kiss - keyboards (on "Obsolescence")
Rob Rebeck - keyboards (on "Continuum"), additional keyboards
Chris Wilson - additional vocals (on "All Things Dead")

 Production
Colin Marks - artwork, layout
Colin Marston - mixing, mastering
Robert Rebeck - producer, engineering, recording, mixing

References

2014 albums
Origin (band) albums
Nuclear Blast albums